NZPI can stand for various things:

Parakai Aerodrome, NZPI code
New Zealand Planning Institute